The Soul is a Chinese-Taiwanese neo-noir sci-fi mystery crime film based on Jiang Bo's (江波) novel Yihun Youshu (移魂有术). It is directed by Cheng Wei-hao and stars Chang Chen, Janine Chang, Sun Anke and Christopher Lee.

Plot
The film opens to a crime scene at a luxurious house. The police discovers that CEO Wang Shi-Cong, founder of a corporation developing futuristic cancer treatments, has been brutally murdered. His wife, Li Yan, was holding the murder weapon. We cut to a hospital where Ah-Bao, a detective, is having an ultrasound, her baby is 7 weeks old. She is accompanied by her husband Liang Wen-Chao, who is a prosecutor. In the next scene, we learn Liang has cancer which is spreading and resisting treatment. The doctor advises them to consider RNA restoration technology.

Ah-Bao is assigned to the case of CEO Wang while Liang becomes the prosecutor. During interrogation, Li Yan reveals that she witnessed the murder and it was actually Wang Tian-You, the son, who did it. Doctor Wan also believes that the son murdered his father because he had been disinherited. The maid reveals that Wang's first wife, Tang Su-Zhen, was diagnosed with depression, due to Wang's indifference after the birth of their son and his infidelity. Tang eventually commits suicide. Before she died, she put a curse on her husband.

They discover that there is a security camera inside Li Yan's room. While sifting through the clips, they find that Li Yan has been having epileptic fits while she sleeps. She has also been hallucinating and talking to Tang Su-Zhen. Liang goes through the clips and finds that Doctor Wan and Li Yan seem to be involved. While searching online, he finds paparazzi reports of Doctor Wan and Tang Su-Zhen's affair. Liang now believes that the epileptic fits are somewhat responsible. He notes that when Li Yan first arrived at the Wang residence, she was a right-hander. However, during the interrogation, she had signed her witness statements with her left hand. Her demeanor before and after the epileptic fits had also changed. Doctor Wan started treating her differently after the fits.

While visiting the company, they sit through Doctor Wan's TED talk. The RNA technology is revealed to be effective in curing degenerative brain cells. It is also possible to transfer brain cells from one entity to another. While questioning Doctor Wan, Liang shows the doctor printouts of his affair with Tang. The journalist who witnessed Tang's suicide had told the police that Doctor Wan had been at the scene. Liang accuses the doctor of copying Tang's brain cells into Li Yan, to bring his lover back. The doctor denies this.

The police eventually discover Wang Tian-You's whereabouts. They apprehend him and bring him in for questioning. When Li Yan and Tian-You is placed in a room together, Li Yan starts acting up. When she snaps out of it, it seems like she has been taken over by Tang. She thanks her son for killing his father and they both become emotional.

In the car, Liang has an epileptic episode and he awakens in the hospital. Ah-bao tells him that the cancer has reached his brain but Wang's company has agreed to provide free RNA technology to help them. Liang eventually finds out that his wife made a deal with Doctor Wan, by tampering with evidence, for free RNA treatment. He is furious that she would jeopardize her career just to buy him a little bit of time as every living moment is torture for him and he would rather die. However, Ah-bao begs to differ and they argue.

Meanwhile, Li Yan is released and she goes home with Doctor Wan. Not long after, Li Yan is seen running from her home screaming for help while Doctor Wan chases her. She goes to the police and tells them that the doctor had tried to force her to sign the company over to him. When she refused he tried to murder her. Li Yan eventually takes over the company and becomes the CEO.

We learn that the evidence that Ah-bao tampered with turns out to be actual recording of the murder. It is Li Yan and CEO Wang's voice. Liang confronts Li Yan and accuses her of being Wang himself. He believes that Wang had copied his brain to Li Yan. While dying in bed, Wang made numerous wrong choices for the company, causing its stock to tumble. Li Yan (but really Wang no.2), desperate for the well-being of "his" company, decides that it's time for Wang to die so she gives the son a fake letter from his mother. In the letter, it instructed the son to kill Wang on a certain date. However, the son runs away at the last minute so Li Yan steps in to deal the killing blow. Liang explains that he started suspecting Li Yan because of how she wrote Wang's name when she was filling out a form. It was a exact replica of Wang's signature. Li Yan doesn't deny any of this but drives away nonchalantly.

Doctor Wan, who has been in hiding, eventually goes to Liang and confesses everything. He and CEO Wang were actual lovers. Wang has gender dysphoria since young but due to his high status, he quashed it. But for appearances sake, Wang was forced to marry. On the outside, his marriage to Tang Su-Zhen seemed to be perfect but Tang started showing signs of depression due to neglect. Out of guilt, Doctor Wan starts spending more time with her, and this soon developed into emotional dependence from her part. While trying to find evidence that her husband was having affairs, she found out about their relationship. Out of despair, she commits suicide. CEO Wang is diagnosed with cancer not long after. In order to save Wang, Doctor Wan brings in Li Yan, who grew up in one of the orphanages that the company patrons. Using the RNA technology that he and Tang had been researching, he copies almost all of Wang's brain into Li Yan. She starts getting epileptic fits at night but afterwards, starts showing marked change in her demeanor. Then everything else is just as Liang had suspected.

Doctor Wan begs Liang to take him in and he will confess to everything. However, Liang refuses because this would bring up Ah-bao's evidence tampering. We cut to the Wang residence where Liang visits Li Yan. While they talk and she is distracted, Doctor Wan goes in and attacks her. Liang goes to his superior and confesses that he had been the one to tamper with the evidence. At court, Li Yan pleads guilty to everything. By this time, Liang is a at his final stages of cancer. Doctor Wan is seen committing suicide by lethal injection on his old lover's bed. Ah-bao is seen visiting Li Yan in prison. She is emotional while she shows Li Yan the baby. Then we see Li Yan making a certain gesture that only Liang would make.

Cast
Chang Chen as Liang Wen-Chao
Janine Chang as Ah-Bao
Sun Anke as Li Yan
Christopher Lee as Doctor Wan Yufan
 as Tang Su-Zhen
Erek Lin as Wang Tian-You
 as Wang Shi-Cong
Lü Hsueh-feng as Zhang
Daniel Chang (張哲豪) as Liang

Production
Director Cheng Wei-hao asked male lead Chang Chen to lose 10 kilograms and shave his head for his role as cancer patient Liang Wenchao. Chang lost 12 kg within three months. Janine Chang changed her hairstyle for the film, cutting her hair short for her role as a police officer. In preparation for filming, Cheng Wei-hao and Janine Chang visited police stations to talk to female officers about their work and observe police officers' uniforms and behavior on the job.

The film began shooting on 20 November 2019 and began post-production in early 2020.

Six minutes of the film were cut from the mainland Chinese version due to censorship, mainly of violence.

Release
The Soul was released in mainland China on 15 January 2021 and grossed RMB111 million.

The film was released on 29 January 2021 in Taiwan and grossed TWD50.9 million.

The film was released internationally for streaming on Netflix, on 14 April 2021.

Reception

On Douban, The Soul initially reached an average rating of 7.3 out of 10, which fell to 7.1 soon after its release. It received an average score of 8.0 on Maoyan and 8.1 on Taopiaopiao.

Critic Sean Aversa praised the film for its intricate and unpredictable plot, saying that it was "exceptionally well written" and the cast's performance was excellent. Decider called it "a dark, dense film that’ll reward attentive viewers and turn away those looking for light entertainment", while Han Cheung of the Taipei Times lauded its "suspenseful, nuanced storytelling". Jiang Bo, author of the original novel, said that the adaptation was extremely successful.

On the other hand, Derek Elley panned the film, calling it "relentlessly downbeat" and describing the plot as "convoluted and outrageous".

See also
 Cinema of Taiwan
 List of Taiwanese films

References

External links

2021 films
Censored films
Chinese-language films
Chinese science fiction films
Chinese mystery films
Chinese crime films
Taiwanese crime films
Taiwanese science fiction films